Carlos Coimbra da Luz (4 August 1894 – 9 February 1961) was a Brazilian politician, lawyer, teacher and journalist who served as acting president of Brazil from November 8 to November 11, 1955.

After the political crisis following the Getúlio Vargas suicide in 1954, Carlos Luz was the second of three presidents who ruled Brazil in a brief period of 16 months. At the time of President Café Filho's alleged illness in 1955 he was the president of the Chamber of Deputies, and so the next in the line of succession to the presidency, since Filho had been the vice president under Vargas. Luz headed the government only three days in November 1955 and was replaced by the vice-president of the Senate Nereu Ramos on the orders of the Minister of Defence Henrique Teixeira Lott over his fear that Luz might support a plot to prevent President-elect Juscelino Kubitschek from taking office in January 1956. Luz was removed through impeachment, with the Congress, under pressure by the military, declaring him unable to fulfill his duties.

Luz was married to his first wife, Maria José Dantas Luz, from 1920 until her death in 1924. They had two children together. Later, Luz remained married to Graciema da Luz until his death in Rio de Janeiro in February 1961.

As of 2022, Luz remains the shortest-serving president of Brazil.

References

1894 births
1961 deaths
Presidents of Brazil
Presidents of the Chamber of Deputies (Brazil)
Social Democratic Party (Brazil, 1945–65) politicians
Ministers of Justice of Brazil
Leaders ousted by a coup
Impeached presidents removed from office
Impeached Presidents of Brazil